"No Flex Zone" is the debut single by American hip hop duo Rae Sremmurd. It was released on May 18, 2014, by EarDrummers Entertainment and Interscope Records, as the lead single from their debut studio album SremmLife (2015). The song was produced by Mike Will Made It and A+. The hip hop song, which appears on the duo's debut album SremmLife (2015), has since peaked at number 36 on the US Billboard Hot 100 chart. The music video for the song was released on September 18, 2014. The song has been certified 2× Platinum by the RIAA for sales of over one million copies.

Music video
On August 11, 2014, the music video was released. The video depicts Rae Sremmurd holding a party. Comedian Mike Epps makes an appearance in the video.

Remixes
The official remix features guest verses from fellow American rappers, Nicki Minaj and Pusha T, the verses from Pusha T and Nicki Minaj were from their freestyles of the song. West Coast rapper Kid Ink, also remixed the song, featuring Travis Porter and Hardhead.

Another remix was done by rapper Watsky and pop band Karmin with no involvement of the original artist. It interpolates the original chorus.

In other media 
The song is heard in an episode of the television series Black-ish.

Personnel
Credits adapted from SremmLife booklet.

Song credits

Writing – Aaquil Brown, Khalif Brown, Michael Williams II, Asheton Hogan
Production – Mike Will Made It
Co-production – A+
Recording – P-Nazty at Ear Druma Studios in Atlanta, Georgia
Audio mixing – Stephen Hybicki and Mike Will Made It at Ear Druma Studios in Atlanta, Georgia
Mastering – Dave Kutch, The Mastering Palace, New York City

Charts

Weekly charts

Year-end charts

Certifications

References

External links 
 

2014 debut singles
2014 songs
Rae Sremmurd songs
Songs written by Swae Lee
Interscope Records singles
Song recordings produced by Mike Will Made It
Songs written by Slim Jxmmi
Songs written by Mike Will Made It
Songs written by Asheton Hogan